Michele Pazienza (born 5 August 1982) is an Italian football coach, and a former player who played as a defensive midfielder. He is currently in charge of Audace Cerignola.

Career

Foggia
Pazienza was born in San Severo in the province of Foggia, and grew up in Foggia Calcio's youth team. He made his debut with the first team in Serie C2 in 2000. Pazienza played with Foggia until 2003, scoring 6 goals in 88 appearances, and helping the team reach the promotion play-offs in 2002, and promotion to Serie C1 in 2003.

Udinese
The following season Pazienza then transferred to Udinese, also making his Serie A debut with the club. He made 52 appearances in his two seasons with the club.

Fiorentina
Pazienza left on loan to Fiorentina for the 2005–06 and 2006–07 seasons for a loan fee of €350,000 annually and was then purchased outright by the club in June 2007 for an additional fee of €3.15 million (a misc. fee that cost La Viola an additional €160,000 was later shifted to other company); he made 52 league appearances for la Viola in total.

Napoli
During the 2008 winter transfer window, Pazienza was purchased by Napoli in a -year contract for a transfer fee of €4.25 million. In total, he made 106 appearances for the club, scoring 4 goals.

Juventus
On 9 June 2011, Pazienza signed a three-year contract with Juventus on a free transfer. After only making eight appearances under Antonio Conte, he moved on loan from Juventus back to Udinese on 31 January 2012, where he played the remainder of the season, making 15 appearances and scoring a goal, for a total of 23 Serie A appearances that season.

Bologna
On 30 August 2012, Pazienza was purchased by Bologna for €300,000 on a three-year contract, worth €1,081,615 in the first season and €1,261,569 in the second and the third season respectively in gross. The transfer also cost Bologna an additional €366,000 as other fee. Pazienza was ranked joint-4th as the highest earner of Bologna player in 2012–13 season.

Pazienza made 37 league appearances for Bologna in the first two seasons. However, he did not play any game in his last year of contract in 2014–15 season, which the club was relegated to Serie B.

Vicenza & Reggiana
On 14 July 2015, Pazienza signed for Serie B club Vicenza Calcio on a free transfer; he was awarded the number 4 shirt.

On 4 February 2016, he was transferred to Lega Pro side Reggiana in a five-month contract.

In summer 2016, along with other free agents, Pazienza obtained the license to be a youth team coach (UEFA B License).

Manfredonia
In August Pazienza started to train with Serie D club Manfredonia. He signed a contract on 24 September.

Style of play
Although Pazienza primarily excelled as a ball winner, and at breaking down opposition attacks, he was also capable of aiding his team offensively, due to his stamina, work-rate, dynamism, finesse, and ability to make attacking runs into the area; he was also able to aid his team creatively and was an effective assist provider.

Coaching career
Pazienza was promoted to the head coach position at Serie C club Pisa from their Under-19 squad on 19 October 2017 following the firing of Carmine Gautieri. He was dismissed from Pisa on 26 March 2018. On 5 November 2018, he was appointed manager of Siracusa. He was fired by Siracusa on 15 December 2018.

On 15 July 2020, Pazienza was named new head coach of Serie D club Audace Cerignola. Despite failing on promotion, he was confirmed also for the 2021–22 Serie D campaign, during which he led Audace Cerignola to be crowned Group H champions, thus ensuring themselves a Serie C place for the first time in over 80 years in the club's history.

Managerial statistics

Honours

Managerial
 Audace Cerignola
 Serie D: 2021–22 (Group H)

References

External links

1982 births
Living people
People from San Severo
Italian footballers
Calcio Foggia 1920 players
Udinese Calcio players
ACF Fiorentina players
S.S.C. Napoli players
Juventus F.C. players
Bologna F.C. 1909 players
L.R. Vicenza players
A.C. Reggiana 1919 players
Manfredonia Calcio players
Association football midfielders
Serie A players
Serie B players
Serie C players
Italian football managers
Pisa S.C. managers
Footballers from Apulia
Sportspeople from the Province of Foggia